Alex Shimizu is an American actor of Japanese descent.

Early life
Shimizu was born and raised in Manhattan, New York. He began his career as a dancer for the National Dance Institute while attending Hunter College Elementary School. He was mentored by founder Jacques d'Amboise and featured alongside him on the CBS Evening News and NPR with guest host Christopher Walken.

Acting career
Shimizu performed Off Broadway and in the film version of Julie Taymor's A Midsummer Night's Dream. The film was shown at the 2014 Toronto International Film Festival as part of the Mavericks in Film Programme. He is best known for portraying the recurring character Tadashi Ito on the NBC series The Blacklist starring James Spader and Toshiro Furuya on season 2 of AMC's horror anthology series The Terror which focused on the Japanese American internment camps during World War II.

Filmography

Film

Television

References

External links

Year of birth missing (living people)
Living people
American male television actors
21st-century American male actors